Calotes mystaceus, the Indo-Chinese forest lizard or blue crested lizard, is an agamid lizard found in China, South Asia and Southeast Asia.

Description/Identification

Physical Structure: Upper head-scales smooth or feebly keeled, imbricate, scarcely enlarged on supraorbital region; a few small spines on each side of the head above the tympanum; latter measuring at least half the diameter of the orbit. Gular sac small; gular scales feebly keeled, as large as dorsals. An oblique fold in front of the shoulder. Dorso-nuchal crest well developed in the male, composed of falciform spines directed backwards, the longest measuring the diameter of the orbit; it gradually decreases in height on the back, being reduced to a mere denticulation on the sacrum. 45-53 scales round the middle of the body; dorsal scales keeled, nearly twice as large as ventrals, all directed upwards and backwards; ventral scales strongly keeled. The adpressed hind limb reaches the tympanum or the posterior border of the orbit; fourth finger slightly longer than the third. Tail a little compressed, at the base with a slightly serrated upper ridge.

Color Pattern:  Background color grey to olive, frequently with large transverse red spots on the back; lips yellowish.

Length: Maximum: 42 cm., Common: 28 cm. (Snout to vent 9.5 cm.).

Maximum published weight: ? g.

Distribution
Cambodia, China (Yunnan), India (Mizoram), Laos, Myanmar (Tenasserim to Naypyitaw = Naypyitaw, Mandalay, and Kachin State [26°00N, 97°30E]), Thailand (Chiang Saen) (north of the Isthmus of Kra), & Vietnam (South). It is also reported from Bangladesh (Chittagong Hill tracts), adjacent to Mizoram province of India. The Indochinese Bloodsucker is first documentation in Florida from Okeechobee County and Glades County.

Vernacular names
Bengali: নীল-মাথা গিরিগিটি (Neel-matha girigiti), নীলা রক্তচোষা (proposed)।

Burmese: ပုတ်သင်ညို  (Pote Thin Nyo)

Chinese: 白唇树蜥

English: Blue-crested lizard, Indo-Chinese bloodsucker, Indo-Chinese forest lizard, White-lipped calotes.

Hindi:girgit

Khmer (Cambodian): បង្គួយក្បាលខៀវខាងលិចទន្លេមេគង្គ

Lao: ກະປອມ gabpom

Thai: กะปอม/กิ้งก่า gabpawm/ginggaa

Vietnamese: ?

Habitat
Terrestrial & arboreal; diurnal; naturally found in forest, but can be found in treed neighborhoods and city parks.

Diet 
Feeds on crickets, grasshoppers, moths, and other insects.

Reproduction
Oviparous; -----.

Uses
No known practical uses. Plays an insectivorous role in its ecosystem.

Threat to humans 
Non-venomous and harmless to humans. Can give a painful bite if handled, but is not dangerous.

IUCN threat status 
Not Evaluated (NE).

References

 Hallermann, J. 2005 Mit Hörnern, Kämmen und Gleithäuten - die bizarren Baumagamen. Reptilia (Münster) 10 (1): 18-25

External links
 
 http://itgmv1.fzk.de/www/itg/uetz/herp/photos/Calotes_mystaceus.jpg

Calotes
Reptiles described in 1837
Taxa named by André Marie Constant Duméril
Taxa named by Gabriel Bibron
Reptiles of Myanmar
Reptiles of Cambodia
Reptiles of China
Reptiles of India
Reptiles of Laos
Reptiles of Thailand
Reptiles of Vietnam